Carroll Eugene Simcox (April 14, 1912 – October 16, 2002) was an American Episcopal priest and editor of The Living Church magazine. Simcox was born in Lisbon, North Dakota and educated at the University of North Dakota. He received his Masters Degree from Oberlin Theological Seminary and later his Doctorate in Classical Philology from the University of Illinois. He was ordained deacon in 1937 and priest in 1938. Simcox was rector of Zion Episcopal Church, Manchester, Vermont, and instructor at Bennington College from 1950 to 1955. In the 1950s he was on the staff of St. Thomas Episcopal Church, Fifth Avenue in New York City. He served as rector of St. Mary's Episcopal Church, Tampa, Florida from 1958 to 1964.

In Vermont, Simcox began a serious writing career. In 1982, he left the Episcopal Church to join the American Episcopal Church, and later served as a priest in the Anglican Church in America.

His wife Georgiana (died 1999) was news editor of The Living Church.

Bibliography

 Living the Creed (Morehouse-Gorham, 1950)
 Historical road of Anglicanism (Regnery, 1968)
 Treasury of Quotations on Christian Themes (Seabury, 1975)
 Prayer: The Divine Dialog (Intervarsity Press, 1985)
 Eternal You: An Exploration of a Spiritual Intuition (New York: Crossroad, 1986)

References

 "Former TLC Editor, the Rev. Caroll Simcox, dies at age 90," obituary notice in The Living Church, November 10, 2002, p. 14.

External links
 
 Natter (BLOG) from Louie Crew's Anglican Pages (Unofficial) Email appreciation of Simcox by Louie Crew. Archived on Sept. 28, 2012

1912 births
2002 deaths
People from Lisbon, North Dakota
University of North Dakota alumni
American Episcopal priests
American Continuing Anglicans
Bennington College faculty
American magazine editors
Journalists from North Dakota
20th-century American Episcopalians
20th-century American journalists
American male journalists
20th-century American clergy